Night Moves is a 1975 American neo-noir film directed by Arthur Penn, and starring Gene Hackman, Jennifer Warren, Susan Clark, with supporting performances from Melanie Griffith and James Woods. Its plot follows a Los Angeles private investigator who uncovers a series of sinister events while searching for the missing teenage daughter of a former movie actress.

Hackman was nominated for a BAFTA Award for his portrayal of private investigator Harry Moseby. The film has been called "a seminal modern noir work from the 1970s", which refers to its relationship with the film noir tradition of detective films. The original screenplay is by Scottish writer Alan Sharp.

Although Night Moves was not considered particularly successful at the time of its release, it has attracted viewers and significant critical attention following its videotape and DVD releases. In 2010, Manohla Dargis described it as "the great, despairing Night Moves (1975), with Gene Hackman as a private detective who ends up circling the abyss, a noexit comment on the post-1968, post-Watergate times."

Plot
Harry Moseby is a retired professional football player now working as a private investigator in Los Angeles. He discovers that his wife Ellen is having an affair with a man named Marty Heller.

Aging former actress Arlene Iverson hires Harry to find her 16-year-old daughter Delly Grastner. Arlene's only source of income is her daughter's trust fund, but it requires Delly to be living with her. Arlene gives Harry the name of one of Delly's friends in Los Angeles, a mechanic called Quentin. Quentin tells Harry that he last saw Delly at a New Mexico film location, where she started flirting with one of Arlene's old flames, stuntman Marv Ellman. Harry realizes that the injuries to Quentin's face are from fighting the stuntman and sympathizes with his bitterness towards Delly. He travels to the film location and talks to Marv and stunt coordinator Joey Ziegler. Before returning to Los Angeles, Harry is surprised to see Quentin working on Marv's stunt plane.

Harry suspects that Delly may be trying to seduce her mother's ex-lovers and travels to the Florida Keys, where her stepfather Tom Iverson lives. Harry finds Delly staying with Tom and his girlfriend Paula. Harry, Paula, and Delly take a boat trip to go swimming, but Delly becomes distraught when she finds the submerged wreckage of a small plane with the decomposing body of the pilot inside. Paula marks the spot with a buoy, and when they return to shore, she appears to report the find to the Coast Guard. Later that night she visits Harry's cabin and the two make love.

Harry persuades Delly to return to her mother in California. After he drops her off at her California home, he still is uneasy about the case, but focuses on patching up his own marriage. He tells his wife he will give up the agency, something she has wanted him to do for a long time, but then he learns that Delly has been killed in a car accident on the set of a movie.

Harry questions the driver of the car, Joey, who was injured. Joey lets him view footage of the crash, which raises Harry's suspicions about Quentin the mechanic. He goes to the home of Arlene Iverson and finds her drunk by the pool, not particularly grief-stricken over the death of her daughter. Arlene now stands to inherit her daughter's wealth. Harry tracks down Quentin, who denies being the killer, but tells him that Marv Ellman was the dead pilot in the plane and that Ellman was involved in smuggling. Quentin manages to escape before Harry can learn more.

Harry returns to Florida, where he finds the body of Quentin floating in Tom's dolphin pen. Harry accuses Tom of the murder; they fight, and Tom is knocked unconscious. Paula admits she did not report the dead body in the plane because the aircraft contained a valuable sculpture that they were smuggling piecemeal from the Yucatan to the United States. Harry and Paula set off to retrieve the relic. While Paula is diving, a seaplane arrives, and the pilot strafes the boat, machine-gunning Harry in the leg. The seaplane lands on the ocean, but when the pilot sees Paula surface with the sculpture, he taxies the plane over her and kills her. The impact of the pontoons on the surfaced sculpture flips the seaplane, and as the cockpit submerges, Harry is able to see through the glass window beneath his boat that the drowning pilot is Joey Ziegler. Harry unsuccessfully tries to steer the boat, which is now going in circles.

Cast

Production
Night Moves was filmed in the fall of 1973, but for undisclosed reasons, was not released until 1975. The role of Ellen, played by Susan Clark, was originally offered to Faye Dunaway who turned it down to star in Chinatown. Dunaway had just split from one of the film's stars - Harris Yulin - after a two year relationship. Night Movess original title, Dark Tower, had to be changed so as to not confuse the film with the 1974 blockbuster hit The Towering Inferno.  The house belonging to James Woods' character Quentin was owned by Phil Kaufman, road manager for Gram Parsons at the time of Parsons's death. Kaufman's subsequent actions became the basis for the 2003 film Grand Theft Parsons. The cast and crew of Night Moves were shooting at the house on the day the police came to question Kaufman, and as they were taking him away, Arthur Penn turned to Gene Hackman and said, "Man, we're shooting the wrong movie".

My Night at Maud's
An often quoted line from Night Moves occurs when Moseby declines an invitation from his wife to see the movie My Night at Maud's (1970): "I saw a Rohmer film once. It was kinda like watching paint dry." The exchange from Night Moves was quoted in director Éric Rohmer's New York Times obituary in 2010. Arthur Penn was an admirer of Rohmer's films; Bruce Jackson has written an extended discussion of the role of My Night at Maud's in Night Moves;  its protagonist and Moseby have related opportunities for infidelity, but respond differently.

Release
Critical response
Roger Ebert gave the film a full four stars and called it "one of the best psychological thrillers in a long time, probably since Don't Look Now. It has an ending that comes not only as a complete surprise — which would be easy enough — but that also pulls everything together in a new way, one we hadn't thought of before, one that's almost unbearably poignant." Ebert ranked Night Moves at No. 2 on his year-end list of the best films of 1975, behind only Nashville. Vincent Canby of The New York Times wrote that he had "mixed feelings" about the film, elaborating that the characters "seem to deserve better than the quality of the narrative given them. I can't figure out whether the screenplay by Alan Sharp was worked on too much or not enough, or whether Mr. Penn and his actors accepted the screenplay with more respect than it deserves." Gene Siskel of the Chicago Tribune gave the film three stars out of four and stated that the protagonist is the "kind of mixed-up character" that "seems to be Hackman's specialty", while Alan Sharp's screenplay "provides the character of Paula (Jennifer Warren) with some of the best scripting for any woman this year". Arthur D. Murphy of Variety called the film "a paradox. A suspenseless suspenser, very well cast with players who lend sustained interest to largely theatrical characters ... There's little rhyme or reason for the plot's progression, and the climax is far from stunning. But the curious aspect about the Warner Bros. release is that it plays well." Kevin Thomas of the Los Angeles Times described the film as "a stunning, stylish detective mystery in the classic Raymond Chandler-Ross Macdonald mold," as well as "a fast, often funny movie with lots of compassionately observed real, living, breathing people. This handsome Warners presentation is still another triumph for ever-busy, ever-versatile Gene Hackman, director Arthur Penn and writer Alan Sharp." Gary Arnold of The Washington Post was negative, stating, "The fatal weakness is Alan Sharp's screenplay, a pointlessly murky, ambiguous variation on conventional private-eye themes ... we're supposed to be so impressed by the dolorous, world-weary tone that we overlook some pretty awesome loopholes and absurdities in the story itself, which never generates much mystery, suspense or credible human interest."

Night Moves continues to attract critical attention long after its release. Film critic Michael Sragow included the film in his 1990 review collection entitled Produced and Abandoned: The Best Films You've Never Seen. Stephen Prince has written, "Penn directed a group of key pictures in the late 1960s and early 1970s (Bonnie and Clyde (1967), Alice's Restaurant (1969), Little Big Man (1970), Night Moves (1975)) that captured the verve of the counterculture, its subsequent collapse, and the ensuing despair of the post-Watergate era." In his monograph, The Cinema of Loneliness: Penn, Stone, Kubrick, Scorsese, Spielberg, Altman, Robert Kolker writes, "Night Moves was Penn's point of turning, his last carefully structured work, a strong and bitter film, whose bitterness emerges from an anxiety and from a loneliness that exists as a given, rather than a loneliness fought against, a fight that marks most of Penn's best work. Night Moves is a film of impotence and despair, and it marks the end of a cycle of films." Dennis Schwartz characterizes the film as "a seminal modern noir work from the 1970s" and adds, "This is arguably the best film that Arthur Penn has ever done." This remark is telling in the context of Penn's earlier film, Bonnie and Clyde (1967), which is now considered a classic by most critics. Roger Ebert added the film to his "Great Movies" list in 2006.

Griffith's appearance in the movie garnered particular controversy for one racy nude scene that was shot when she was only 17 years old at the time, though she also appeared nude in other films such as Smile which was released the same year.

Night Moves has been classified by some critics as a "neo-noir" film, representing a further development of the film noir detective story. Ronald Schwartz summarizes its role: "Harry Moseby is a man with limitations and weaknesses, a new dimension for detectives in the 1970s. Gone are the Philip Marlowes and tough-guy private investigators who have tremendous insight into crime and can triumph over criminals because they carry within them a code of honor. Harry cannot fathom what honor is, much less be subsumed by it."

The film currently holds a score of 82% on Rotten Tomatoes based on 17 reviews.

Box office
Night Moves was not a commercial success at the time of its 1975 theatrical release. 

Home media
Night Moves was released in 1992 in the U.S. as a LaserDisc and as a VHS-format videotape. In 2005, it was released as a DVD in the U.S. and Canada (region 1). The DVD was favorably reviewed by Walter Chaw, who writes, "Shot through with grain and a certain, specific colour blanch I associate with the best movies from what I believe to be the best era in film history, Night Moves looks on Warner's DVD as good as it ever has, or, I daresay, should." A region 2 DVD was released in 2007. The film was released on Blu-ray in 2017 by Warner Archive Collection.

See also
 List of American films of 1975
 Sanibel and Wakulla Springs, two Florida locations where filming took place

References

Sources

  
 
 

 

 Further reading'''
 Emanuel Berman's extended interpretation of the film's screenplay.
 David N. Meyer's review includes a fairly rare effort to parse Night Moves in terms of the contributions of its screenplay, directing, acting, etc.. Meyer particularly credits Gene Hackman's performance, Alan Sharp's writing, and Dede Allen's editing.
Gear, Matthew Asprey. Moseby Confidential: Arthur Penn's Night Moves and the Rise of Neo-Noir.'' Portland, Ore.: Jorvik Press, 2019. Emphasizes Sharp's inspiration and conflicts with Penn. Based on interviews with Sharp's widow, Warren, Clark, and others.

External links

 
 
 

1975 films
1970s crime thriller films
1970s mystery thriller films
American crime thriller films
American detective films
American mystery thriller films
Films directed by Arthur Penn
Films scored by Michael Small
Films set in Florida
Films set in Los Angeles
Films shot in Florida
Warner Bros. films
American neo-noir films
1970s American films
1970s English-language films